Cheshire Cat is a fictional supervillain appearing in American comic books published by Marvel Comics.

Publication history
Cheshire Cat first appeared in Power Man #37 and was created by Marv Wolfman, Ron Wilson, and Ed Hannigan.

Fictional character biography
A crime lord called Big Brother summoned Cheshire Cat over from Los Angeles to help him against a rival crime lord called Baron. Working as an informant, he told Big Brother where Power Man could be found.

Cheshire Cat followed Luke Cage and informed Big Brother that he survived his fight with Chemistro II, which was being witnessed by Baron's henchman Checkpoint Charlie. Power Man later stormed Big Brother's hideout, where he confronted Big Brother and Cheshire Cat.

Cheshire Cat watched Power Man and Big Brother's fight while also being present when Big Brother told Power Man about Baron. After Power Man left, Cheshire Cat and Big Brother discuss their plans to have Power Man destroy Baron. Cheshire Cat then disappeared where he wants his revenge on Power Man. After Cheshire Cat teleported back to Big Brother and told him about Power Man's meeting with Baron, Big Brother gave Cheshire Cat the orders to kill Power Man.

While invisible, Cheshire Cat watched as Power Man smashed up Big Brother's control room and then reported it to Big Brother. Much later, Cheshire Cat was with Big Brother in his helicopter when Power Man was tied up on the train that was under Big Brother's control. After the train crashed, Big Brother and Cheshire Cat rode their helicopter down to the wreckage to see if Power Man is dead. Power Man fought Big Brother as Cheshire Cat watched as the helicopter crashed to the ground and exploded.

During the Shadowland storyline, Cheshire Cat resurfaced where he appears as a member of Nightshade's Flashmob (which also consisted of Chemistro III, Comanche, Dontrell Hamilton, Mr. Fish II, and Spear) where they attacked Victor Alvarez on the rooftop. When Cheshire Cat disappeared to evade Victor Alvarez' attack, Cheshire Cat was quickly knocked out by Iron Fist when he and Luke Cage arrived. The Flashmob was remanded to Ryker's Island. Nightshade's solicitor Big Ben Donovan was able to secure the release of Dontrell Hamilton, Mr. Fish II, and Spear while Cheshire Cat, Chemistro II, and Comanche had to remain in prison due to their warrants and/or parole violations.

During the Spider-Island storyline, Cheshire Cat was with Flashmob when they tried to leave Manhattan during the spider outbreak and was defeated by Heroes for Hire.

Powers and abilities
Cheshire Cat has the ability to become invisible and intangible. He can also teleport with his arrival being a secret due to his invisibility.

References

External links
 Cheshire Cat at Marvel Wiki
 Cheshire Cat at Comic Vine
 Cheshire Cat at Marvel Appendix

Marvel Comics supervillains
Comics characters introduced in 1976
Fictional henchmen
Fictional gangsters
Fictional characters who can turn invisible
Characters created by Marv Wolfman
Characters created by Ron Wilson
Marvel Comics characters who can teleport